Brent Woody Musburger (born May 26, 1939) is an American sportscaster, currently the lead broadcaster and managing editor at Vegas Stats and Information Network (VSiN).

With CBS Sports from 1973 until 1990, he was one of the original members of their program The NFL Today and is credited with coining the phrase "March Madness" to describe the NCAA Division I men's basketball tournament while covering the Final Four. While at CBS, Musburger also covered the Super Bowl, NBA Finals, the World Series, U.S. Open tennis, and The Masters.

Joining ESPN and ABC Sports in 1990, Musburger continued to cover the NBA Finals, as well as hosting Monday Night Football and providing play-by-play for Saturday Night Football and the SEC Network. He covered the Indianapolis 500, U.S. Open and British Open golf, the World Cup, the Belmont Stakes, and the College Football national championship among other big events. In January 2017, he left the ESPN and ABC television networks after 27 years, briefly retiring from play-by-play of live sports before returning as the play-by-play voice of the Las Vegas Raiders from 2018 until 2022. 

Raised in Billings, Montana, he is a member of the Montana Broadcaster's Association Hall of Fame.

Early life and career
Musburger was born in Portland, Oregon, and raised in Billings, Montana, the son of Beryl Ruth (Woody) and Cec Musburger. He was an umpire for minor league baseball during the 1950s. He was also a boyhood friend of former Major League pitcher Dave McNally. His brother, Todd Musburger, is a prominent sports agent.

Musburger's youth included some brushes with trouble: when he was 12, he and his brother stole a car belonging to their mother's cleaning lady and took it for a joy ride. His parents sent him to the Shattuck-St. Mary's School in Faribault, Minnesota. Educated at Northwestern University's Medill School of Journalism, he was kicked out for a year for owning and operating a car without a license.

Musburger began his career as a sportswriter for the now-defunct Chicago American newspaper, where he worked with legendary sportswriter Warren Brown. In 1968, Musburger penned a column regarding Tommie Smith and John Carlos's protest of racial injustice in the United States with a Black Power salute on the medal stand during the 1968 Summer Olympics. In it he stated "Smith and Carlos looked like a couple of black-skinned storm troopers" who were "ignoble," "juvenile," and "unimaginative". In a 1999 article in The New York Times, Musburger stated that comparing the two to the Nazis was "harsh", but he stood by his criticism of the pair's action:

According to Carlos, Musburger never apologized:

Carlos later told Jemele Hill during a 2019 discussion that "Brent Musburger doesn't even exist in my mind. He didn't mean anything to me 51 years ago. He doesn't mean anything to me today. Because he's been proven to be wrong."

In 1968, Musburger began a 22-year association with CBS, first as a sports anchor for WBBM radio and later for WBBM-TV. In the mid-1970s, Musburger moved to Los Angeles and anchored news and sports for KNXT (now KCBS-TV); there he worked alongside Connie Chung as a co-anchor on KNXT's evening newscasts from 1978 until 1980, when he joined CBS Sports full-time.

In 2020, Musburger told the Sports Illustrated Media Podcast that he has always won while betting the length of the Super Bowl national anthem by having his friends attend the rehearsal the day before the game and time it: "Some people have lip-synched it and that was an easy win because that recording is automatic."

CBS Sports (1973–1990)
Beginning in late 1973, Musburger was doing play-by-play for CBS Sports. He started out doing regular season National Football League games (future The NFL Today co-host Irv Cross was also doing NFL games at that time as well). Musburger was paired with Tommy Mason or Bart Starr, who provided the color commentary. A year later, Wayne Walker would be paired with Musburger in the booth.

By 1975 at CBS, Musburger went from doing NFL play-by-play (and other items, mostly on CBS' Sports Saturday/Sunday programs) to rising to prominence as the host of the network's National Football League studio show, The NFL Today. Suddenly, Musburger began to cover many assignments for CBS Sports. Among the other events he covered, either as studio host or play-by-play announcer, were college football and basketball, the National Basketball Association, horse racing, the U.S. Open (tennis) tournament, and The Masters golf tournament. He would even lend his talents to weekend afternoon fare such as The World's Strongest Man contests and the like. Musburger also called Major League Baseball games for CBS Radio.

The NFL Today
But it was Musburger's association with The NFL Today that made him famous. During his tenure, CBS' NFL pregame show was consistently the #1 rated pregame show. One of the signatures of the program was Musburger's show-opening teases to the various games CBS would cover, along with live images from the various stadiums. Musburger's accompanying intro to each visual, "You are looking live at ..." became one of his catch phrases.  In promoting the network, his voice often tailed off on the last letter of "CBS" ("C.B. eeezz"), creating another catch phrase.

Musburger made headlines when he got into a fist-fight with The NFL Todays betting analyst Jimmy "The Greek" Snyder in a Manhattan bar on October 27, 1980. However, the fist-fight incident was quickly regarded as water under the bridge as the two cheerfully appeared on The NFL Today the following week wearing boxing gloves on camera.

CBS departure
By the late 1980s, Musburger was CBS's top sportscaster. He was the main host and play-by-play announcer for the NBA Finals, college basketball, college football, the Belmont Stakes, and the College World Series. He also hosted a New Year's Eve countdown for CBS. Musburger is regarded as the first broadcaster to apply the term March Madness to the annual NCAA Men's Division I Basketball Championship tournament.

Early in 1990, CBS underwent a significant management change. During the early morning hours of April 1, 1990, Musburger was fired from CBS. His final assignment for CBS came the following evening, doing play-by-play for the 1990 NCAA men's basketball final, which was Duke versus UNLV. When the game was completed, Musburger thanked the audience and CBS Sports, and the analysts that he had worked with through the years like Billy Packer, who was standing next to him.

At the time of his firing (which he originally thought was an April Fools joke), Musburger had been set to handle play-by-play duties for CBS's television coverage of Major League Baseball later that month; he was replaced by Jack Buck in that capacity. His position at The NFL Today was filled by Greg Gumbel. His position as the lead play-by-play announcer for college basketball was filled by Jim Nantz.

ABC Sports and ESPN (1990–2017)
Following his dismissal from CBS, Musburger considered several offers, including one to return to Chicago and work at WGN-TV, ultimately settling at ABC. With Al Michaels entrenched as ABC's top broadcaster, Musburger focused on college football and basketball. After his hiring, ABC's merger with ESPN under the Disney umbrella allowed him to work on ESPN as well (increasingly since 2006), including Major League Baseball, NBA games, ESPN Radio, golf tournaments, horse racing, the Indianapolis 500, Little League World Series, soccer games, college football, and even some NFL games (including hosting halftime duties for Monday Night Football and Wild Card round games). Musburger was also the main studio host during ABC's coverage of the 1998 World Cup and the 2006 World Cup, was briefly the studio host for ESPN and ABC's NASCAR coverage and has hosted Tour de France coverage for ABC.

Major League Baseball
In 1995, Musburger called Games 3-5 of the American League Division Series between the Seattle Mariners and New York Yankees alongside Jim Kaat for ABC in association with The Baseball Network. The fifth and decisive game went into the bottom of the 11th inning before Edgar Martínez won it for Seattle with a double that scored both Joey Cora and Ken Griffey Jr., sending them to the League Championship Series for the first time in their franchise's history.

Musberger's call, dramatic as it was, incorrectly implied that Bernie Williams fielded the double in left. Bernie was playing center field at the time. Gerald Williams was in left field playing the ball and making the late throw back to the infield.

Musburger and Jim Kaat later called Games 1-2 of the 1995 American League Championship Series, while the rest of the games were called by Bob Costas and Bob Uecker on NBC.

College football
 
Musburger's college football duties for ESPN and ABC have included calling seven BCS National Championship games (2000, 2004, 2010, 2011, 2012, 2013, and 2014).

Beginning in 2006, Musburger called ABC Sports' college football prime time series, along with analysts Bob Davie and Kirk Herbstreit. Musburger called the 2007 Rose Bowl, taking over for the retired Keith Jackson. He also called games on ESPN during his time at ABC.

During the 2013 BCS National Championship Game between Alabama and Notre Dame, a camera turned to Katherine Webb, who was in the stands cheering for her boyfriend, Alabama quarterback, A. J. McCarron. Musburger, impressed with Webb's beauty, remarked, "I'm telling you, you quarterbacks get all the good-looking women. What a beautiful woman. Wow!" and continued commenting in a similar fashion. The next day, ESPN apologized for his comments, saying they "went too far". The controversy died down quickly afterwards, largely due to Webb stating that she was not bothered at all by Musburger's comments. As the Raiders' new radio broadcaster in 2018, Musburger jokingly revisited the incident with a Twitter post welcoming the now-married McCarrons to Oakland after the Raiders acquired AJ from the Buffalo Bills.

Musburger's involvement with Saturday Night Football concluded when he and Jesse Palmer were named ESPN's lead game commentators for college football coverage on the SEC Network in 2014.  Musburger nevertheless called some games on ESPN and ABC after that time.

VSIN, Oakland/Las Vegas Raiders (2018–present) 
At the 2017 Sugar Bowl, held in early January, Musburger made controversial comments about then-University of Oklahoma running back Joe Mixon. Mixon had previously punched and broken a woman's jaw.

Later in the same month, Musburger announced that he would retire from play-by-play broadcasting and would call his final game at Rupp Arena in Lexington, Kentucky, on January 31, 2017.

Musburger stated he planned to help his family get a sports handicapping business started in Las Vegas, have a sports gambling show on Sirius XM Radio, and enjoy personal travel. The new venture, Vegas Stats & Information Network (VSiN) is the first multichannel network dedicated to sports gambling information and is broadcast from a custom-built studio at the South Point Hotel, Casino & Spa. Musburger serves as managing editor of the network, and hosts its program My Guys in the Desert (a reference to his sly mentions of events of interest to bookmakers during his play-by-play). Musburger and his sons sold VSiN to DraftKings in March 2021 while remaining executives and on-air personalities with the network.

On July 17, 2018, it was reported that Musburger would be making his return to the broadcast booth, this time as the new radio voice for the Oakland Raiders under a three-year contract (which included its inaugural season in Las Vegas in 2020), succeeding Greg Papa. Musburger continued as announcer through the 2021 season.

Style
Musburger has a down-to-earth manner of speaking, often addressing his viewers as "folks".  In a Sports Illustrated profile done on Musburger in January 1984, he stressed his hesitance to "pontificate" during his broadcasts. In 2004, CNN Sports Illustrated's Stewart Mandel selected him as the second-best college football announcer, behind Ron Franklin. Mandel said of Musburger, "His voice will always be associated with some of the sport's most memorable, modern moments."

Musburger has a reputation for pointing out attractive women in the crowds of the games he calls; among those who later rose to fame include Susan “Busty Heart” Sykes, Jenn Sterger, and Katherine Webb McCarron.

Other media
Musburger was a reporter in Rocky II and had his role immortalized in a 2006 action figure. He also played the right leg of the fictional monster Scuzzlebutt on an episode of South Park. He also made cameo appearances in The Main Event and The Waterboy. In Cars 2 and Planes, he played Brent Mustangburger, a fictionalized version of himself. He appeared as himself in the episode "Lying Around" on the ABC sitcom Happy Endings. Musburger is portrayed by John Dellaporta in the HBO series Winning Time: The Rise of the Lakers Dynasty.

Career timeline
 1973–75: NFL on CBS play-by-play
 1975–80; 1983–89: NBA on CBS play-by-play (lead play-by-play, 1975–80)
 1975–89: The NFL Today studio host
 1976–89: US Open (tennis) play-by-play
 1981–84: College Basketball on CBS studio host
 1983–88: The Masters studio host
 1984–89: NCAA Football on CBS play-by-play (lead play-by-play, 1984–88)
 1984: World Series commentator for CBS Radio Network
 1985–90: College Basketball on CBS lead play-by-play
 1990–96: Monday Night Football studio host
 1990–2009: College Basketball on ABC play-by-play
 1990–2014: College Football on ABC play-by-play
 1990–2017: College Basketball on ESPN play-by-play
 1991–92, 1997–98, 2000–11: Little League World Series play-by-play
 1992–96: PGA Tour on ABC host
 1993, 1997, 2003, 2007–14, 2016: Rose Bowl play-by-play
 1994–95: Baseball Night in America #2 play-by-play for ABC
 1996–2004: NBA Finals play-by-play for ESPN Radio
 1998, 2006: World Cup studio host
 2000, 2004, 2010–14: BCS National Championship Game play-by-play (television)
 2002–06: NBA on ESPN and NBA on ABC play-by-play
 2005–12: Indianapolis 500 studio host
 2006–13: Saturday Night Football play-by-play
 2007: NASCAR on ABC studio host
 2007–09: BCS National Championship Game play-by-play (ESPN Radio)
 2014–17: SEC Network lead play-by-play
 2017–present: Vegas Stats & Information Network
 2018–2021: Oakland/Las Vegas Raiders radio play-by-play

References

Bibliography 
 Sandomir, Richard, "TV Sports: Now on Film: Raised Fists and the Yogi Love Letters", The New York Times, 6 August 1999

External links

 ESPN profile
 

1939 births
Living people
American horse racing announcers
American radio sports announcers
American television sports announcers
ArenaBowl broadcasters
Arena football announcers
Association football commentators
College basketball announcers in the United States
College football announcers
Cycling announcers
Golf writers and broadcasters
Las Vegas Raiders announcers
Major League Baseball broadcasters
Medill School of Journalism alumni
Motorsport announcers
National Basketball Association broadcasters
National Football League announcers
Oakland Raiders announcers
People from Jupiter, Florida
Poker commentators
People from Billings, Montana
Television anchors from Portland, Oregon
Television anchors from Chicago
Television anchors from Los Angeles
Tennis commentators